Chloe Franks (born 1 September 1963) is a British actress, best known for her appearances as little girls in British films of the 1970s. Franks was born in London, England.

Career 
Her best remembered role was as Jane Reid, the young, witchcraft-obsessed daughter of Christopher Lee in the Amicus horror anthology film The House That Dripped Blood (1970). She also portrayed Katy Coombs in Whoever Slew Auntie Roo? (1971), alongside Shelley Winters who played Aunt Roo, and Mark Lester, who played her brother, Christopher. She also appeared as Fredericka Armfeldt, the daughter of Desiree Armfeldt (played by Elizabeth Taylor) in the Oscar winning  musical A Little Night Music.

Filmography

Film

Television

External links 

Living people
British child actresses
20th-century British actresses
1963 births